Julianka may refer to the following places in Poland:
Julianka, Kuyavian-Pomeranian Voivodeship (north-central Poland)
Julianka, Podlaskie Voivodeship (north-east Poland)
Julianka, Silesian Voivodeship (south Poland)